Jan Oskar Kieniewicz  (born 7 August 1938) is a Polish historian, diplomat and humanities professor. He specialised in the history of India (particularly pre-colonisation) and European, Spanish and Polish history. He is a member of the Collegium Invisibile and the jury for the KLIO Award.

Life
Born in Warsaw to professor Stefan Kieniewicz, he graduated in history in 1960 and his doctorate in 1966, both from the University of Warsaw, where he also spent much of his academic career, serving as head of its Department of Spanish Studies (1975-1981) and deputy director of its Institute of History (1981-1988). He became a habilitated doctor in 1974 and was awarded the title of professor in the humanities in 1983, retiring as a full professor at the University of Warsaw.

He also served as Poland's ambassador to Spain (1990-1994) and as deputy director of the Instytutu Badań Interdyscyplinarnych Artes Liberales (1996-2008). After retiring he remained a lecturer at the University of Warsaw's Faculty of Liberal Arts. He was awarded the Knight's Cross of the Order of Polonia Restituta in 2005 and the Officer's Cross of the same order in 2013.

Selected works 
 Portugalczycy w Azji: XV–XX wiek (1976)
 Od Bengalu do Bangladeszu (1976)
 Historia Indii (1980)
 Od ekspansji do dominacji. Próba teorii kolonializmu (1986)
 Spotkania Wschodu (1999)
 Historia Polski (1986, co-authored with Jerzy Holzer and Michał Tymowski)
 Historia Europy  (1998, co-author)
 Wprowadzenie do historii cywilizacji Wschodu i Zachodu (2003)
 Cmentarz Bródnowski (2007, editing and scientific study)
 Wyraz na ustach zapomniany (2013)

References

Bibliography 
  
  'Jan Kieniewicz' on „Ludzie nauki” (OPI)

Living people
1938 births
20th-century Polish historians
Polish male non-fiction writers
Polish Indologists
Academic staff of the University of Warsaw
Polish diplomats
Ambassadors of Poland to Spain
Fellows of Collegium Invisibile
Officers of the Order of Polonia Restituta
Knights of the Order of Polonia Restituta
Historians of Spain
University of Warsaw alumni